Kyle Gass Band (KGB) is an American rock band formed in Los Angeles, California in 2011. Fronted by Tenacious D lead guitarist Kyle Gass and vocalist and guitarist Mike Bray. The backing band consists of electric guitarist John Konesky (also of Tenacious D), bassist Jason Keene, and drummer Tim Spier. The band have released two albums, Kyle Gass Band (2013) and Thundering Herd (2016). The band also occasionally tours acoustically (without Keene and Spier) as The Kyle Gass Company.

History

Background 
Gass and Jack Black formed the band Tenacious D in 1994 whilst they were members of The Actors' Gang theater company in Los Angeles. Black's popularity as an actor began to increase in the early 2000s, with appearances in films such as High Fidelity, Saving Silverman and Shallow Hal. These appearances meant that Black was unable to dedicate as much time with Gass for Tenacious D, causing Gass to form the side-project Trainwreck in 2002. In the summer of 2010, the lead singer of Trainwreck, JR Reed, was unable to make a party Gass had been invited to play, causing Gass to form a one-off band called Kyle Gass' Falcon, an early version of what would become the Kyle Gass Band. Trainwreck later split in 2011, causing Gass to form a new project.

Formation and beginnings (2011–2013)
Gass and Konesky were both of Tenacious D and former members of Trainwreck. Mike Bray was hand-selected by Gass to front the Kyle Gass Band. Mike came to Los Angeles from Mahomet, Illinois in 2007 and formed "Band of Bigfoot", where each band member dressed up as bigfoot. After doing some shows in the Pacific Northwest opening for Trainwreck in 2009 and '10, Gass noticed talent in Bray, and invited him to be the lead vocalist. Bassist Jason Keene was picked for the group, an old friend of Gass. The drumming position in the band was originally filled by Trainwreck's Nate Rothacker from until 2013, it was then given to Jamie Douglass in 2013 and then Tim Spier in mid-2014.

The band recorded their first material throughout 2011 and some recordings in 2012, with their self-titled debut album releasing independently in July 2013. The album was re-released on SPV GmbH in April 2015 for Europe. In June 2015, the band released their first music video for "Our Job to Rock" with the Jash Network. In September 2016, their second album, Thundering Herd was released in Europe, and in November 2016 worldwide.

Touring (2011–present)
The band played their first gig at the 2011 NAMM Show opening for Mike Campbell in early January. They played their first independent show at DiPiazza's in Los Angeles on the 18th June 2011. By 2017, they had held seven European tours, covering fourteen different countries. Following their 2017 European tour, the band have made few appearances live, mainly a small 2019 tour in May.

In the fall of 2019 Gass, Bray and Konesky performed as The Kyle Gass Company, opening with a handful of original songs followed by covers of Tenacious D and other bands.

Discography
Albums
Kyle Gass Band (2013)
Thundering Herd (2016)
Singles
NAMM 2013 Promotional CD (2013)
Our Job to Rock (2015)

Band members
Mike Bray – lead vocals, guitar (2011–present) 
Kyle Gass – lead acoustic guitar, vocals, flute (2011–present)
John Konesky – lead electric guitar, backing vocals (2011–present)
Jason Keene – bass, harmonica (2011–present)
Tim Spier - drums (2014–present)

Touring musicians
Jokin Salaverria – bass (2014)

Former members
Nate Rothacker - drums (2011–2013)
Jamie Douglass - drums (2013–2014)

References

External links

Rock music groups from California
Musical groups established in 2011
Musical groups from Los Angeles
Tenacious D
2011 establishments in California